NGC 6745 (also known as UGC 11391) is an irregular galaxy about 206 million light-years (63.5 mega-parsecs) away in the constellation Lyra.  It is actually a trio of galaxies in the process of colliding.

The three galaxies have been colliding for hundreds of millions of years. After passing through the larger galaxy (NGC 6745A), the smaller one (NGC 6745B) is now moving away. The larger galaxy was probably a spiral galaxy before the collision, but was damaged and now appears peculiar. It is unlikely that any stars in the two galaxies collided directly because of the vast distances between them. The gas, dust, and ambient magnetic fields of the galaxies, however, do interact directly in a collision. As a result of this interaction, the smaller galaxy has probably lost most of its interstellar medium to the larger one.

See also 
 IC 1296
 Antennae Galaxies

References

External links 
 
 NGC 6745: The Astronomer's Story
 HubbleSite - NewsCenter - A Bird's Eye view of a Galaxy Collision
 

Spiral galaxies
Irregular galaxies
Interacting galaxies
Peculiar galaxies
Lyra (constellation)
6745
11391
62691